Laysah may refer to:
 Laysah, Golestan
 Laysah, Mazandaran